Jabłoński (feminine: Jabłońska; plural: Jabłońscy) is a Polish surname derived from the noun jabłoń (apple tree). It appears in various forms when transliterated from Cyrillic alphabets.

People 
 Aleksander Jabłoński (1898–1980), Polish physicist
 Benedict Jablonski (1917–2003), science fiction fan and booster
 Carl Gustav Jablonsky (1756–1787), Berlin naturalist, entomologist and illustrator
 Constance Jablonski (born 1990), French fashion model
 Daniel Ernst Jablonski (1660–1741), German theologian and reformer
 Dariusz Jabłoński (born 1961), Polish film director and producer
 David Jablonski (born 1953), American professor of geophysical sciences
 Edward Jablonski (1923–2004), American author
 Edward Jabłoński (1919–1970), Polish football player
 Elżbieta Jabłońska (born 1970), Polish multidisciplinary visual artist
 Grigoriy Yablonsky (born 1940), Russian chemist
 Hanna Yablonska (1981–2011), Ukrainian playwright and poet
 Henryk Jabłoński (1909–2003), Polish socialist and communist politician, historian and professor
 Jacquelyn Jablonski (born 1992), American fashion model
 Jonas Jablonskis (1860–1930), Lithuanian linguist who standardized the Lithuanian language
 Jeremy Yablonski (born 1980), a Canadian ice hockey left winger who currently plays for the Binghamton Senators in the AHL
 Johann Theodor Jablonski (1654–1731), German lexicographer
 Joseph Yablonski (1910–1969), American labor leader who was murdered in 1969 by assassins hired by a union political opponent
 Karol Jabłoński (born 1962), Polish regatta helmsman, skipper, ice sailor
Marek Jablonski (born 1939), Polish-Canadian classical pianist
 Mary Anne Jablonski (born c. 1952), Canadian politician from Alberta
 Mirosław Jabłoński, Polish football manager
 Nina Jablonski (born 1953), American anthropologist and science writer
 Oxana Yablonskaya (born 1938), Russian pianist
 Pat Jablonski  (born 1967), American ice hockey player
 Phillip Carl Jablonski (1946–2019), American serial killer from California
 Ray Jablonski (1926–1985), American third baseman in Major League Baseball played third base
 Peter Jablonski (born 1971), Swedish pianist
 Sergey Yablonsky (1924–1998), a Soviet and Russian mathematician
 Stefania Jabłońska (1920–2015), Polish physician
 Steve Jablonsky (born 1970), American music composer for film and television
 Tetyana Yablonska (1917–2005), Ukrainian painter
 Tomasz Jabłoński (born 1988), Polish boxer
 Vinnie Yablonski (1923–2008), American football player
 Wanda Jablonski (1920–1992), journalist who covered the oil and petroleum industries
 Sofia Yablonska (1907–1971), travel writer

Fictional characters 
 Bubbles Yablonsky
 Cliff Yablonski
 Daphne Jablonski, character in the television series Party of Five, played by Jennifer Aspen

Other
 Jablonski diagram, diagram that illustrates the electronic states of a molecule and the transitions between them
 Jablonski by Pahls v. United States, a landmark court case that helped to define the ethical duties of mental health professionals with respect to potentially violent individuals.
 Wola Jabłońska, village in west-central Poland

Polish-language surnames